Cheese of Pico is a cheese originating from the island of Pico in the Portuguese archipelago of the Azores. It has been classified as a "Denomination of Protected Origin", in accordance with the laws of the European Union since October 1996.

History

It is unknown when Queijo do Pico was first made, but there are references to its fabrication dating as far back as the end of the 18th century; the manner of its preparation has been handed down to descendants since it was first cured.

Characteristics
This cured cheese is produced from cow milk, from a slow coagulation process that takes 20 to 30 days. Its fat content ranges from between 45% and 49%, and it is considered a fatty cheese.
The ripening of the cheese forms a yellow exterior irregular crust and yellowish-white, soft and pasty interior. Pico cheese has a salty taste and a characteristically intense aroma.

See also
 List of Portuguese cheeses with protected status
 List of cheeses

References
Notes

Sources

 

Portuguese cheeses
Portuguese products with protected designation of origin
Portuguese cuisine
Economy of the Azores
Cheeses with designation of origin protected in the European Union